George Washington stood for public office five times, serving two terms in the Virginia House of Burgesses and two terms as President of the United States. He is the only independent elected as U.S. president and the only person unanimously elected to that office.

1755 House of Burgesses election
Washington first stood for election to the Virginia House of Burgesses from Frederick County, Virginia in 1755 at the age of 23. Two burgesses were elected from each Virginia county by and among the male landowners. Members of the House of Burgesses did not serve fixed terms, unlike its successor the Virginia House of Delegates, and it remained sitting until dissolved by the governor or until seven years had passed, whichever occurred sooner. 

Elections during this time were not conducted by secret ballot but rather by viva voce. The sheriff of the county, a clerk, and a representative of each candidate would be seated at a table, and each elector would approach the table and openly declare his vote. In elections to the House of Burgesses, each voter cast two votes and two candidates were elected who received the greatest number of votes.

1758 House of Burgesses election

In 1758, Washington again stood for election to the House of Burgesses. Washington's campaign was managed by Colonel James Wood, who procured 160 gallons of alcoholic drinks and distributed them gratis to 391 voters in the county. Washington won the election with more than 39-percent of the vote. Thomas Bryan Martin won Frederick County's other house seat; he was the nephew of the Lord Fairfax of Cameron, governor of Virginia.

1761 House of Burgesses election
Washington successfully stood for re-election to his seat in the House of Burgesses in 1761, campaigning with his neighbor George Mercer. The three candidates were Washington, Mercer, and Adam Stephen, and all three had fought together during the disastrous Battle of Fort Necessity in the Seven Years' War. Stephen emerged as a critic of Washington, unlike Mercer, and their rivalry continued through to the American Revolution.  

Washington and Mercer received the support of "the leaders of all the patrician families" of the county, while Stephen attracted "the attention of the plebians".

1788–89 United States presidential election

The first U.S. presidential election was held over a period of weeks from December 1788 to January 1789. Washington was elected with 69 of the 69 first-round votes cast in the United States Electoral College. With this election, he became the only U.S. president to be unanimously chosen. 

No popular vote totals are listed in this table. In early elections, many electors were chosen by state legislatures instead of public balloting, and votes were cast for undifferentiated lists of candidates in those states which practiced public balloting, leaving no or only partial vote totals.

1792 United States presidential election
Washington was unanimously re-elected President of the United States in the 1792 election, carrying all first-round electoral votes.

See also
 Presidency of George Washington
 1788–89 United States presidential election
 1792 United States presidential election
 Second inauguration of George Washington
 List of George Washington articles

References

George Washington
Washington, George
Washington, George